Rollinia ecuadorensis is a species of plant in the Annonaceae family. It is endemic to Ecuador.  Its natural habitat is subtropical or tropical moist lowland forests. It is threatened by habitat loss.

References

ecuadorensis
Endemic flora of Ecuador
Near threatened flora of South America
Taxonomy articles created by Polbot
Taxobox binomials not recognized by IUCN